Edward Doyle was an Irish Labour Party politician. He was first elected to Dáil Éireann as a Labour Party Teachta Dála (TD) for the Carlow–Kilkenny constituency at the 1923 general election. He was re-elected at the June 1927 and the September 1927 general elections. He stood as an independent candidate at the 1932 general election, but lost his seat.

References

Year of birth missing
Year of death missing
Labour Party (Ireland) TDs
Members of the 4th Dáil
Members of the 5th Dáil
Members of the 6th Dáil